Ixtepec (formally: Ciudad Ixtepec; previously known as Villa de San Jerónimo Doctor) is a small city, and  municipality of the same name, located in the state of Oaxaca, in southern Mexico.  
It is part of the Juchitán District in the west of the Istmo de Tehuantepec region.

History
The name "Ixtepec" is derived from Nahuatl and roughly translates to either "view of the mountain" or "face of the mountain."Its name was Iztepeque until 1935, when it was officially changed to Ciudad Ixtepec (Ixtepec City). The founding of the city was most likely in the 16th century as a Zapotec settlement shortly before the Spanish Conquest. It remained an indigenous community until the 19th century, with its economy based on subsistence farming. In the early 20th century, the community grew in economic importance as its location made it attractive to foreign investment with the building of the Pan-American Highway, originally as a rail line.

Environment
The municipality has an area of 229.65 km2 at an average elevation of 40 meters above sea level.
The climate is warm, with rainfall of 950 mm annually mostly falling in the summer.
Average temperature is 27.4 °C, ranging from 21.5 °C to 30.7 °C.

Climate

Economy

As of 2005, there were 6,481 households with a population of 24,181, of whom 4,667 spoke an indigenous language.
Like Ixtaltepec, Juchitán and Tehuantepec, Ixtepec has a significant native Zapotec population.  Many indigenous traditions are still followed.

Ixtepec used to be an important railway center point, but nowadays no passenger train traffic runs through.  However, a university has recently been constructed there.
Economic activities include very limited agriculture on 972 hectares of irrigated land growing corn, sorghum, sesame and vegetables, 408 small farms raising cattle, pigs or goats, fish hatcheries for crappie, tilapia and red snapper, manufacture of bricks, school uniforms and home furnishings, and mining of black clay for making pots and figurines and adobe bricks.

Communities

As municipal seat, Ciudad Ixtepec has governing authority over the following communities:
 
Cheguigo Juárez 
Quinta Sección
Chivaguí
Colonia Alejandro Cruz Martínez
Colonia la Candelaria
Colonia Niza Luba
5 de Febrero
Llano Blanco
Imperio Jeromeño
Piedra Bola
El Carrizal (Chivaniza)
El Zapote
Guichilana
Guigobazaá
La Guadalupe
La Huana Milpería
La Providencia
La Rufa
Laguna Bacuela
Los Cascabeles
Los Laureles
Niza Shiga (Monte Grande)
Nizandá  
Rancho Félix Enríquez Sangermán
Río Seco
Llano Grande
San Jerónimo

References

Municipalities of Oaxaca